Elery may refer to:

 Elery, Ohio, an unincorporated community in Henry County, in the U.S. state of Ohio
 Elery Hanley, English former rugby league player and coach
 Elery Hamilton-Smith, Australian interdisciplinary scholar and academic
 Elery "Ed" Guy Greathouse, American boxer 
 Lawrence Elery Wilson, American businessman and politician
 Elery's tube-nosed bat, a species of common bats first discovered in a forest of northern Vietnam.

See also 
 Ellery (disambiguation)